Nida-i-Millat (also known as Nida-e-Millat) is a weekly international Urdu language news magazine published by famous Nawa-i-Waqt group of Pakistan published from Lahore, Punjab, Pakistan. It contains reports, analysis and interviews of good standard. It covers local and global politics, social issues, economic problems and disputes. Its Editor Name is Muhammad Anis Ur Rehman, Younger Editor in the history of group, Known as expert of international affairs particularly Middle East affairs. He writes in Urdu, Arabic and English.

References

External links
 Nida-i-Millat's official website

Mass media in Lahore
News magazines published in Pakistan
Weekly magazines published in Pakistan
Urdu-language magazines
Magazines with year of establishment missing